

The Rotor Flight Dynamics Dominator is an American autogyro designed by Ernie Boyette of Rotor Flight Dynamics of Wimauma, Florida, and made available in the form of plans and kits for amateur construction.

Design and development
The Dominator is an open frame autogyro, constructed of bolted aluminium tubing and powered by a  Rotax 503 engine with a pusher propeller. The Dominator has both a single-seat and tandem two-seat variants. It was one of the first autogyros to use a high tailplane to reduce dynamic and aerodynamic torque.

Variants
Dominator I
Single-seat variant powered by a  Rotax 503 engine. 35 flying by 1998.
Dominator Tandem
Two-seat variant powered by a  Rotax 914,   Subaru EA-81 automotive conversion, or similar engine. Four flying by 1998.
Rotor Flight Dynamics Dominator UltraWhite
A lightweight version of the Dominator without any fairing and powered by a  Rotax 503 two-stroke.
Rotor Flight Dynamics Dominator Single
Single-seat variant powered by a  Rotax 503 two-stroke or a  Subaru EA-81 four stroke automotive conversion with an Autoflight gearbox.

Specifications (Dominator I)

See also

References

Notes

Bibliography

External links

Single-engined pusher autogyros
Homebuilt aircraft
2000s United States civil utility aircraft
Rotor Flight Dynamics aircraft